Throughout its history, ESPN and its sister networks have been the targets of criticism for programming choices, biased coverage, conflict of interest, and controversies with individual broadcasters and analysts. Additionally, ESPN has been criticized for focusing too much on men's college basketball, LeBron James, Aaron Judge and football and very little on other sports such as the National Hockey League and Major League Baseball. Other criticism has focused on issues of race and ethnicity in ESPN's varying mediated forms, as well as carriage fees and issues regarding the exportation of ESPN content.

Some critics argue that ESPN's success is their ability to provide other enterprise and investigative sports news while competing with other hard sports-news-producing outlets such as Yahoo! Sports and Fox Sports. Some scholars have challenged ESPN's journalistic integrity calling for an expanded standard of professionalism to prevent biased coverage and conflicts of interest. Mike Freeman's 2001 book ESPN: The Uncensored History, which alleged sexual harassment, drug use and gambling, was the first critical study of ESPN. And then in 2011, a detailed oral history about ESPN by James Andrew Miller and Tom Shales called Those Guys Have All the Fun: Inside the World of ESPN was released.

Cost and finances
ESPN currently charges the highest retransmission consent fee of any major cable television network in the United States. In 2011, the main channel alone carried a monthly rate of $4.69 per subscriber (nearly five times the price of the next-costliest channel, TNT), with ESPN's other English language channels costing an additional $1.13 per subscriber; these prices rise on a nearly constant basis. By 2017, ESPN's fees had risen to over $7 for the main channel and roughly $3 for its sister outlets. Part of the cause of this high fee is the amount of money that ESPN pays for sports rights, particularly the NFL. In August 2011, ESPN agreed to pay the NFL $1.9 billion annually for the rights to carry Monday Night Football through 2021; this despite the fact that the broadcast networks pay approximately half that price for their packages, which include lucrative and highly watched contests such as the Super Bowl, conference championships and Thanksgiving games while ESPN's package does not (ESPN's package does include the NFL Draft). Cable and satellite television providers condemned ESPN's most recent contract extension with the NFL and have contemplated moving the network to a higher programming tier to mitigate cost increases.

In 2012, ESPN reportedly paid about $7.3 billion over 12 years for the broadcasting rights to all seven bowl games of the College Football Playoff, an average of about $608 million per year. That includes $215 million per year which they previously agreed to air the Rose, Sugar and Orange bowls, plus $470–475 million annually for the rest of the package. Also in 2012, ESPN and Major League Baseball agreed to an eight-year extension, increasing ESPN's average yearly payment from about $360 million to approximately $700 million. In October 2014, ESPN signed a nine-year extension with the NBA, worth three times as much as the previous deal.

These deals were made when new sports channels like NBCSN and Fox Sports 1 emerged, and so analysts believe that ESPN deliberately drove the prices up as a defensive measure to block these competitors from acquiring live rights. Wall Street analysts have also raised concerns that the amount ESPN is paying for all of these rights could be a major drain on The Walt Disney Company as a whole, since the amount of money that can be recuperated from retransmission consent fees and advertising is limited; Disney still profits from the ESPN division but as of 2015 was cutting the network's higher-priced content to ensure long-term profitability. In October 2015, ESPN laid off about 300 employees, citing the rights costs combined with the increasing trend of cord-cutting. Another 100 employees, mostly in news gathering and including large numbers of public faces of the network, were laid off in April 2017.

John Skipper's time as President of ESPN was tumultuous. During Skipper's tenure (from January 2012 to December 2017) ESPN lost nearly 15% of its subscribers and laid off more than 500 employees. Additionally, ESPN's television ratings declined significantly across the board and the network endured criticism from some quarters over the declining quality of its programming.

Bias towards certain teams and players

ESPN has been accused of having a bias towards certain sports teams and a "love affair" with superstar players. ESPN's ombudsman, Le Anne Schreiber, responded to these criticisms by saying that the industry is ratings-driven.
Since MLB Network launched on January 1, 2009, Baseball Tonight has been the target of criticism because of its perceived bias in favor of certain teams such as the Boston Red Sox and the New York Yankees, both based within driving distance of ESPN's studios in Connecticut. One opinion was expressed by former major-leaguer Heath Bell:

Despite achievements by female athletes, ESPN underrepresents them in its coverage. A longitudinal analysis found that women's sports received less than 2% of the coverage on SportsCenter. When they are covered, critics argue that female athletes have been featured through the lens of femininity, characterized by a display of sociability and passivity.

Carriage disputes

Dish Network
On August 4, 2009, Dish Network sued ESPN for $1 million in a federal breach of contract lawsuit, alleging that the network violated the "Most Favored Nations" clause by not extending the same carriage terms that it provided to Comcast and DirecTV for ESPNU and ESPN Classic. On August 5, ESPN announced it would fight the lawsuit and stated in a press release that "we have repeatedly advised Dish that we are in full compliance with our agreement and have offered them a distribution opportunity with respect to ESPNU and ESPN Classic consistent with the rest of the industry. We will not renegotiate settled contracts and will vigorously defend this legal action, the apparent sole purpose of which is to get a better deal."

Dish Network moved ESPNU from its "America's Top 250" package to its "America's Top 120" package on September 30, 2009. However, the provider claimed that the change had nothing to do with the lawsuit. On June 22, 2010, ESPN majority owner The Walt Disney Company pulled the high definition feeds of ESPNews, Disney Channel, Disney XD and ABC Family from Dish Network's lineup, although the standard definition feeds of all four channels remained on the provider. In March 2014, Disney signed a comprehensive carriage deal with Dish Network for its networks (along with several new networks, such as Disney Junior, Longhorn Network, and SEC Network), including high definition feeds and TV Everywhere access for the networks and ABC owned-and-operated stations, and the ability to distribute their networks on a planned over-the-top internet television service. As a condition of the new deal, Dish Network agreed to disable the ability to use the automatic commercial skipping function on its Hopper DVR on ABC programming within 72 hours of its original airing. In December 2014, Dish Network reached a similar new carriage deal with CBS, restricting the use of AutoHop on CBS programming for seven days after its original airing.

Verizon FiOS
In April 2015, ESPN Inc. sued Verizon for offering ESPN and ESPN2 as part of an optional sports theme package under its new "Custom TV" offering for its FiOS service, breaching a requirement for the two networks to be carried as part of the basic service.

Integration of ABC Sports

In August 2006, ESPN announced that ABC Sports would be fully integrated into ESPN, using the channel's graphics and music for its sports presentations, in addition to handling production responsibilities for the ABC sports telecasts. The last live sporting event televised under the ABC Sports banner was the U.S. Championship Game of the Little League World Series on August 26, 2006 (ABC was slated to carry the Little League World Series Championship Game on August 27, but the game was postponed to August 28 due to rain, and subsequently aired on ESPN2). The changeover took effect the following weekend to coincide with the start of the college football season, with NBA, IndyCar Series and NASCAR coverage eventually following suit.

Despite the rebranding, George Bodenheimer's official title remained "President, ESPN Inc. and ABC Sports" until his retirement at the end of 2011, upon which the "ABC Sports" portion of the title was retired. In addition, ABC itself maintains the copyright over many of the ESPN-branded broadcasts, if they are not contractually assigned to the applicable league or organizer. ABC-affiliated stations owned by Hearst Television (such as WTAE-TV in Pittsburgh; WCVB-TV in Boston; WMUR-TV in Manchester, New Hampshire; WISN-TV in Milwaukee and KMBC-TV in Kansas City) have the right of first refusal over the local simulcasts of ESPN-televised Monday Night Football games involving teams within their home market, which are very rarely waived to other local stations in their market areas. Equally, other Hearst-owned stations affiliated with other networks (such as NBC affiliate WBAL-TV in Baltimore) have been able to air NFL games from ESPN for the same reason.

ESPN has been criticized for decreasing the number of sports broadcasts on ABC, especially during the summer months. One such example is NASCAR: from 2007 to 2009, ABC aired all of the Chase for the NASCAR Sprint Cup races, along with the penultimate race to the chase. From 2010 to 2014, ABC only broadcast three Sprint Cup races with only one Chase race (held in Charlotte, North Carolina) to the outrage of many NASCAR fans and sponsors. Several other events such as the Rose Bowl, the Citrus Bowl and The Open Championship, have also been moved from ABC to ESPN. This, however, is not entirely the fault of ESPN, as ABC in general has attracted a primarily female viewership in recent years, with sports largely attracting a male-dominated audience.

Under NFL broadcasting rules, game telecasts aired on cable must be simulcast on broadcast television in the local markets of the teams playing, though the game cannot be televised in the market of the home team if it does not sell out tickets 72 hours before the time of kickoff – games that are not sold out must be blacked out in the market of origin. Similar rules and rights were previously in place for ESPN-televised Major League Baseball playoff games.

Coverage of individual sports

Arena Football League coverage

Some Arena Football League fans complained that ESPN's 2007 and 2008 game broadcast schedule "inequitably favors teams" such as the Philadelphia Soul, Chicago Rush and Colorado Crush, teams whose ownerships respectively include Jon Bon Jovi, Mike Ditka and John Elway. Fourteen of the seventeen ESPN games featured at least one of the three teams playing in the broadcasts. The Soul (whose part-owner and team president is former Arena Football League on ESPN analyst Ron Jaworski) appeared in seven of the 17 regular season games aired on ESPN platforms, more than any other team in the league. This criticism was also present when NBC opted to not let certain teams appear on their schedule. In 2008, the Chicago Rush had nine regular season games on ESPN and ABC, while the 2007 Arena Bowl Champion San Jose SaberCats appeared in just one – a Week 1 game against the Rush; and the New York Dragons appeared in one broadcast, a 10:30 pm game versus the Crush. Other criticism includes the scheduling of games on various days and times, as opposed to a weekly AFL gameday.

Association football/soccer coverage

2006 FIFA World Cup
Dave O'Brien joined Marcelo Balboa on the primary broadcast team for the 2006 FIFA World Cup coverage on ESPN and ABC Sports, despite having no experience calling soccer matches prior to that year. Because The Walt Disney Company, owner of both television outlets, retained control over on-air talent, the appointment of O'Brien as the main play-by-play voice was made over the objections of Soccer United Marketing, which wanted JP Dellacamera to continue in that role. Disney stated that its broadcast strategy was intended, in voice and style, to target the vast majority of Americans who do not follow the sport on a regular basis. Mispronunciation and incorrect addressing of names, misuse of soccer terminology, and lack of insight into tactics and history plagued the telecasts, resulting in heavy criticism from English-speaking soccer fans, many of whom ended up watching the games on Spanish-language channel Univision instead.

Major League Soccer coverage

ESPN has been accused of putting more emphasis on overall negativity and the more violent aspect of MLS games (such as two confrontations, two challenges and a player nursing a bloody head in its first six shots) in "Greatest Highlights of the Month" segment for their intermission reports.

Ronaldo vs. Messi rivalry coverage
The Messi-Ronaldo rivalry is one of soccer’s hotly contested topics for over a decade with journalists and pundits as well as fans having their own opinions. While both players have achieved incredible heights, the coverage of the two has been in different lights in some occasions and this hasn’t gone unnoticed with most soccer fans. After Cristiano Ronaldo led Portugal to their first major trophy, ESPN had a debate whether Portugal and Ronaldo deserved to win the trophy. The outlash came about when Lionel Messi won the 2022 Finalissima and ESPN on their official Twitter account tweeted “Tonight, football won”, leading many to wonder whether the coverage of the two was fair. Another occasion that fans were left pondering on the issue came from their Twitter account. In 2018, after Ronaldo scored a superb overhead kick that won UEFA goal of the season vs. Juventus in the quarter final of the 2017-18 UEFA Champions League, ESPN tweeted whether the goal was intentional despite Ronaldo jumping 2.30m in the air to score the goal. This lead many to claim how they were disregarding Ronaldo’s effort. On 6 August 2022, Messi scored an incredible overhead kick vs. Clermont Foot in their opening 2022-23 Ligue 1 season. ESPN then tweeted “LIONEL MESSI WITH ONE OF THE GREATEST GOALS OF ALL TIME”. This again, lead to many fans to wonder whether the two were viewed under the same light by ESPN.

Major League Baseball coverage

Bonds on Bonds
In 2006, former San Francisco Giants outfielder Barry Bonds starred in Bonds on Bonds, a 10-part reality series that aired on ESPN. At the time, Bonds was mired in allegations of steroid use during his Major League Baseball career. ESPN was criticized for allowing Bonds such a one-sided public pulpit, as it was the most powerful name in American sports journalism; the show was seen by some as ESPN giving up any semblance of journalism in favor of becoming a public relations front for major sports teams and players. ESPN responded to the criticism by claiming that Bonds would not have creative control and that the episodes would be fair, balanced, and only document the day-to-day activities of Bonds as they occurred, not as Bonds wanted them to occur. ESPN and producer Tollin/Robbins Productions officially pulled the plug on the reality series, citing "creative control" issues with star Barry Bonds and his representatives. No other details about the decision were given. Bonds on Bonds had been absent from the network's schedule since May 30, 2006, and had been generating poor ratings.

NASCAR coverage

Local station pre-emptions
NASCAR's coverage during its time on ESPN when races aired on ABC was affected by local pre-emptions, usually for breaking news and weather coverage in the vast majority of cases, but also due to conflicts in local programming schedules; many of these examples pre-dated the current solution of most television stations, where the NASCAR race is moved to a sister station or digital subchannel network.

The 2007 Subway 500 from Martinsville Speedway was not shown on ABC owned-and-operated station KABC-TV in Los Angeles (owned by ESPN co-parent The Walt Disney Company) on October 21 due to coverage of a series of wildfires that affected Southern California, specifically the Buckweed fire in Santa Clarita and the Canyon Fire in Malibu. The race was instead shown on its second digital subchannel (branded as "ABC7+"), then not available on satellite providers or on select cable providers in the area.

Several stations chose to pre-empt the pre-race show NASCAR Countdown to carry local newscasts. KABC-TV pre-empted the pre-race program before every Saturday night race, and as well as before the 2007 Ford 400, which was held on a Sunday afternoon, to air an episode of the Disney Channel series The Suite Life of Zack & Cody from the network's ABC Kids block to fulfill E/I programming requirements enforced by the Federal Communications Commission. ABC affiliates WPLG in Miami, Florida, and KSAT-TV in San Antonio, Texas, also pre-empted NASCAR Countdown at least once during the 2007 NASCAR season.

KSAT also aired a brief news update, which came during a red flag, but returned in time for the checkered flag.

The 2008 Sharpie MINI 300 was not seen on several ABC stations for various reasons, ranging from weather bulletins (such as those aired on WSB-TV in Atlanta and WSOC-TV in Charlotte) to stations airing coverage of the Big 12 men's basketball tournament at the time of the race (such as with KLKN in Lincoln, Nebraska; where the race moved to an ESPN2 alternate feed, which is normally used when syndication exclusivity rules force an ESPN blackout). In addition, ABC's New York City flagship station WABC-TV carried the race, but pre-empted NASCAR Countdown and the rain delay to cover a construction accident at a high-rise building in Manhattan.

One pre-emption instance involved the network's primetime programming, After a red flag during lap 284, the 2008 Checker O'Reilly Auto Parts 500 Presented by Pennzoil, viewers in the Eastern and Central Time Zones were forced to watch the finish of the race on Lap 284 on ESPN2 as ABC ended its broadcast of the race to air America's Funniest Home Videos at 7:30 pm Eastern Time, while the network continued the race to its conclusion (ending at 313 laps) in the Mountain and Pacific Time Zones.

NBA coverage

ABC's NBA coverage
Some complaints regarding ESPN have concerned the promotion of NBA telecasts. The 2003 NBA Finals received very little significant promotion on ABC or corporate partner ESPN; while subsequent Finals were promoted more often on both networks, NBA-related advertisements on ABC were still significantly fewer compared to promotions on NBC. NBA promos took up 3 minutes and 55 seconds of airtime on ABC during the week of May 23, 2004, according to the Sports Business Daily, comparable to 2 minutes and 45 seconds for the Indianapolis 500. Promotions for the Indianapolis 500 outnumbered promotions for the NBA Finals fourteen-to-nine from the timeframe between 9:00 and 11:00 pm Eastern Time during that week.

Pistons–Pacers brawl coverage
ESPN's studio team was generally more criticized than praised. After the Pacers–Pistons brawl in November 2004, ESPN's studio team came under severe criticism, both by the media and by the network itself for their stance regarding the actions of Indiana Pacers player Ron Artest (who entered the stands to confront a fan, sparking the melee). John Saunders came down hard on Detroit fans, referring to them as "punks", while Greg Anthony and Tim Legler defended Artest. The day after the brawl, Steve Levy led into a report on the brawl on SportsCenter by saying, "before you unconditionally blame the players, take a look and a listen." He concluded the report on the brawl by calling it "on an overall sorry night for the NBA, and especially fans of the Detroit Pistons," without any reference to the Pacers.

WNBA coverage

During the 2006 WNBA Finals, Detroit Shock head coach, and former ESPN NBA analyst, Bill Laimbeer became irritated by ESPN's coverage. He was quoted by the Detroit Free Press as saying:

LeBron James' "Decision"
On July 8, 2010, basketball player LeBron James announced on a live, one-hour ESPN special titled The Decision that he would leave the Cleveland Cavaliers and join the Miami Heat, beginning with the 2010–11 season. In exchange for the exclusive rights to air the special, ESPN agreed to hand over its advertising and airtime to James. James arranged for the special to include an interview conducted by Jim Gray, who was paid by James' marketing company and had no affiliation with the network. ESPN's reporting leading up to the James special, its decision to air the program, and its decision to relinquish editorial independence were widely cited as gross violations of journalistic ethics.

NCAA Basketball coverage

ESPN is often accused of having a bias towards certain college basketball teams, including those in the Atlantic Coast Conference (ACC), particularly the Duke Blue Devils and North Carolina Tar Heels as well as the Kentucky Wildcats of the Southeastern Conference. ESPN maintains a broadcast rights agreement with the ACC that runs through the 2026–2027 season, which provides additional football, men's and women's basketball and Olympic sports coverage on a variety of platforms, suggesting that the bias may have a financial motivation.

Dick Vitale is often criticized for being a "homer" for Duke, especially for Coach Mike Krzyzewski, as well as most teams within the ACC. He is also known for mentioning Duke frequently during broadcasts, even when the Blue Devils are not playing. Former Temple University head coach John Chaney once said "You can't get Dick Vitale to say 15 words without Duke coming out of his mouth".

NFL coverage

Ben Roethlisberger sexual assault case
On July 18, 2009, Pittsburgh Steelers quarterback Ben Roethlisberger was accused of sexual assault in a civil lawsuit filed by Andrea McNulty. ESPN came under fire for being the only major media outlet that refused to report on the story. ESPN officials attempted to justify their actions by stating that the case is a private matter. Furthermore, ESPN claimed that since Roethlisberger had not addressed the issue publicly, and since no criminal charges had been filed, there was no reason to report on it. However, many have been quick to point out other instances where ESPN has reported on civil cases as well as statements addressing the matter by Roethlisberger's attorney. The network's actions resulted in some media sources accusing them of double standards and poor journalistic practices. ESPN began reporting on the story on July 23, 2009; one month later on August 18, ESPN released a column on its website explaining the network's decision.

Fantasy football and advertising influence
In 2015, ESPN received criticism from Deadspin for accepting advertising from DraftKings, a daily fantasy sports site, and integrating DraftKings into the network's football coverage through product placement, breaching the ethical wall between journalism and sponsorship.

Conflicts of Interests with NFL: Deflategate, concussions, legal issues
In 2011, ESPN agreed to a deal with the NFL worth more than $15 billion. This fact led several media organizations, including Forbes, to argue whether the financial relationship with the league creates a conflict of interest when ESPN covers the NFL. The network has also been accused of alleged pro-NFL bias on labor issues with the league and the union and ignoring or downplaying crimes or scandals committed by owners.

Also, The New York Times reported that ESPN spiked its partnership with the PBS series Frontline on the 2013 documentary "League of Denial", which chronicles the history of head injuries in the NFL, shortly after a meeting between ESPN executives and league commissioner Roger Goodell took place in New York City, though ESPN denies pressure from the NFL led to its backing out of the project, claiming a lack of editorial control instead.

Boston-based journalist Michael Corcoran stated that in the first seven months after the Deflategate scandal became national news, ESPN.com used the term "Deflategate" in 844 separate articles or videos, including the Chris Mortensen's erroneous report about 11 of the 12 footballs used in the 2014 AFC Championship Game were 2 pounds per square inch (PSI) under NFL regulation. This was compared to when Jimmy Haslam, owner of the Cleveland Browns, was accused by the FBI in a 120-page affidavit of a five-year-long "conspiracy to scheme" and "defraud its customers" out of millions in rebates for his company Pilot Flying J. In the first seven months after the FBI raided Haslam's company, ESPN only mentioned the scandal 23 times, less than 3 percent of the coverage of the allegations of football deflation. "ESPN should, at a minimum, disclose the details of its enormous vested interest before reporting any serious story about the league," Corcoran's article concluded.

Nonetheless, in July 2015, The Hollywood Reporter reported that sources within ESPN believed that the NFL gave them a "terrible" 2015 Monday Night Football schedule as "payback" for remarks made on air by both ESPN commentators Keith Olbermann and Bill Simmons that were critical of the league and Goodell; ESPN parted ways with both Olbermann and Simmons during that same year.

2020 NFL Draft coverage
ESPN immediately came under fire for their coverage of the first two nights of the 2020 NFL Draft for focusing too much on the family tragedies of players as they are drafted. Sports blog site Barstool Sports called it "tragedy porn", adding that ESPN not only kept focusing on the death of players' family members, but also questionable stories like a mom battling drug addiction for 16 years.

Monday Night Football coverage

In 2006, ESPN took over the Monday Night Football package from its sister network ABC, who had broadcast the series for 36 years. 14 years later, in 2020, Aaron Barnhart of Primetimer wrote:

The NFL was never one to turn down a lunatic network waving a blank checkbook, so it agreed to let ESPN take Monday Night Football over to cable. Like a billionaire who locks his trophy wife up in their Hamptons home, ESPN immediately moved to minimize its prize. It started referring to the game as just "MNF", three letters, kind of like WTF. It pulled in announcers who would work for ESPN's modest salary. The results, over 15 years, are plain to see. Now it is Monday Night Football, with its second-rate football matchups and endless turnover in the booth, that embodies the "droning blandness of prime time", while Sunday Night Football is the biggest show on turf, and most weeks is the top-rated show on television. And NBC is not alone. CBS and Fox have outbid ESPN in recent years for game and league rights, since nothing like live events can bring a crowd to broadcast TV. Meanwhile, cable customers fed up with high monthly bills have been cord-cutting at record pace. All of this has upended Disney's apple cart. ESPN was able to justify paying sports leagues billions in contract deals because it made tens of billions in revenue on those games. ESPN has always been the priciest channel in your cable bundle, $9 per month per customer in 2017.

Awful Announcings Ben Koo wrote on October 23, 2018, that Jason Witten was "in over his head" as an analyst. Koo added that "Witten made mistakes, was inconsistent, got tongue tied, and could be awkward at times". Meanwhile, the gimmick of placing Booger McFarland in on-field mobile platform is clunky because all involved had to have direct comments and questions to each other explicitly, and there were lulls in the broadcast at times when it's not clear which of McFarland or Witten should be jumping in. As for play-by-play man Joe Tessitore, Koo regarded him as an acquired taste and many were not acquiring it. This was due to Tessitore's style of "going HARD on a lot of calls, in energy and volume." Besides the commentators, Ben Koo complained about the distracting sponsorships from Old Spice and Genesis Motor.

On November 29, 2018, Deadspins Drew Magary said that ESPN "Is too busy living in Monday Night Footballs glorious past, trying to turn the franchise into an event with needless innovations and halftime concerts – like The Chainsmokers during last week's Rams-Chiefs game. All of those efforts to recapture MNF's magic failed, but that hasn't stopped ESPN from continuously trying to doctor up ways to make the game as much of an EVENT as it was back in the 1970s. This is a show imprisoned by its own history. They still have pictures of Howard Cosell adorning the MNF production trucks. They still use the theme. They dragged Hank Williams Jr. out of racist mothballs to sing his stupid fucking song from the '80s salad days. They still use ancient clips of Cosell slurring 'He could go all the way' and 'What a game this turned out to be' and all that nonsense. They refer to Monday records as if they are hallowed... None of that has stopped ESPN from still trying desperately to make Monday Night Football a thing. In the process, they've in fact cheapened the product."

Early on in the 2019 season, there were so many Twitter complaints over ESPN's then new down and distance marker that it was dropped after halftime. ESPN had made the down-and-distance graphic yellow, so it looked like there was a flag on every play. ESPN's Bill Hofheimer tweeted "Our ESPN production team is aware of the feedback on the #MNF down and distance graphic. We have called an audible and adjusted for the 2nd half of #HOUvsNO and for the #DENvsOAK game to follow."

When reviewing ESPN's production of the New England Patriots-New York Jets game from Week 7 of the 2019 season, The A.V. Clubs John Teti wrote that "Once, Monday Night was the climax of an NFL week. Now it often feels like a last gasp. Monday Night isn't special anymore, but the production never formed a new identity to contend with that reality. So there's a lot of pretending. We all must pretend it matters when, say, a running back gains more yards in the third quarter of a Monday Night Football game than anyone has before. It's not clear why the Monday Night-ness of an achievement matters to anyone in 2019—though, did it ever? Regardless, part of the lore of Monday Night Football is that the lore of Monday Night Football is very important indeed."

Oliver Connolly, on November 26, 2019 in The Guardian, wrote "Monday Night Football: the once great NFL show was now the worst on television". The article cited the overblown announcing by Tessitore, incoherent analysis by McFarland and bizarre graphics. Connolly further wrote that "It often feels like the show's producers are more interested in their carefully choreographed packages and graphics than the actual game unfolding on the field. No other broadcast misses a play as consistently as Monday Night Football, continuing to prove that there is nothing in media or entertainment that cannot be ruined by more money and time."

UFC and MMA coverage

Lack of coverage and negative coverage
Despite the growth in popularity of mixed martial arts and its largest promotion – the Ultimate Fighting Championship – in particular, many fans of the sport felt that ESPN treated MMA as a fringe sport by either not showing highlights of recent drawing matchups or by portraying the sport in a negative light.  Commentators such as Mike Wilbon and Tony Kornheiser of Pardon the Interruption, along with Skip Bayless, formerly of First Take have openly criticized the sport as inferior to boxing. Jim Rome of the former ESPN program Jim Rome is Burning however, often defends the sport and featured fighters as guests.

Some MMA fans feel that the influence of ESPN's corporate parent The Walt Disney Company (both due to not having broadcast rights and due to Disney's traditionally family friendly image), along with the influence of the boxing media have contributed to what they perceived as negative coverage of the sport on the channel. Other complaints included the ESPN show MMA Live being aired in a late Friday night (1:00 am Eastern Time) timeslot that many MMA fans feel is inadequate, and is often prone to preemptions due to live programming. After the UFC signed a television rights deal with rival Fox Sports, UFC president Dana White lashed out at ESPN following the cancellation of an appearance for an interview promoting the UFC 134 event.

In 2018, however, ESPN ultimately acquired the U.S. media rights to the UFC beginning in 2019, with a large focus on its subscription service ESPN+.

Coverage of professional wrestling as a legitimate sport

In its early days, ESPN aired various professional wrestling programs, including AWA Championship Wrestling from the American Wrestling Association as well as World Class Championship Wrestling / (United States Wrestling Association). ESPN started distancing itself from professional wrestling after the more athletic-oriented AWA went out of business in 1991, two years after World Wrestling Federation owner Vince McMahon admitted that professional wrestling was staged and was more about entertainment than about legitimate athletic competition. ESPN would not distance itself completely from professional wrestling, as the network commissioned the Global Wrestling Federation for three years following AWA's failure, and Canadian sister network TSN held the Canadian rights to WWE Raw from 1996 to 2006, as well as the parent network having aired This is SportsCenter ads featuring The Undertaker, Stone Cold Steve Austin, John Cena and Becky Lynch  on occasion.

On March 24, 2015, former UFC Heavyweight Champion and then-current WWE World Heavyweight Champion Brock Lesnar appeared on SportsCenter for a "huge announcement" after it became public knowledge that Lesnar's WWE contract was set to expire after WrestleMania 31 and that he had been training for a return to MMA. However, Lesnar used the air time to announce that he in fact had re-signed with WWE and was retired from MMA, with part of the interview being done by then-SportsCenter anchor Jonathan Coachman, himself a then-former WWE announcer. This would be followed up by a segment on SportsCenter covering Lesnar's match with Roman Reigns at WrestleMania 31 for the WWE World Heavyweight Championship, featuring Lesnar, Reigns, and Lesnar's manager Paul Heyman in studio for the segment. (Seth Rollins ultimately won the WWE World Heavyweight Championship at the event after he cashed in his Money in the Bank contract mid-match.) Although ESPN was not criticized for covering WWE, it did receive criticism for covering WWE like a legitimate sport as opposed to entertainment; unlike other countries, the United States generally views professional wrestling as entertainment due to it being an open secret that professional wrestling is staged. Lesnar would subsequently return to MMA (while under contract with WWE) for a one-off match at UFC 200 while WWE and ESPN would gradually increase their collaboration into a regular segment on SportsCenter hosted by Coachman, as well as a subsection devoted to professional wrestling on ESPN.com.

The association between ESPN and WWE has received criticism outside of mainstream media and within the two organizations themselves. Coachman (who himself would leave ESPN in 2017 and eventually return to WWE a few months afterwards) stated he had wanted a connection between ESPN and WWE for years following his departure from WWE in 2008, but had to wait "until the right person was in charge" before the two sides started forming a partnership. In 2016, the wife of WWE wrestler Kevin Owens would post on social media their eight-year-old son's reaction following Owens winning the WWE Universal Championship. While the post would receive positive responses from most reporters, Amin Elhassin for ESPN tweeted that it was feel-good moment for their son "until he finds out its scripted". Fellow wrestler Cody Rhodes, who had left WWE earlier that year, said that WWE needs to cut ties with ESPN and that having mainstream recognition "ain't always worth it" when one of their reporters tries to ruin it for a child. Rhodes did eventually return to the WWE at WrestleMania 38 in April 2022.

Despite ESPN and WWE having somewhat scaled back their relationship since (partially due to other mainstream sports media such as Fox Sports, CBS Sports, Yahoo! Sports, and Bleacher Report also reporting on WWE), the two still partner on occasion.

2021 Nathan's Hot Dog Eating Contest
On July 4, 2021, ESPN experienced on and off technical difficulties during the last minutes of the 2021 Nathan's Hot Dog Eating Contest, where Joey Chestnut set a new world record by eating 76 hot dogs to win the event for the 14th time. The issues forced the network to take two in-competition commercial breaks. The feed cut off again during the finish of the competition, thus preventing viewers from seeing it. Many fans and viewers took to social media to express their anger towards ESPN over the technical issues.

Alternative outlets and third party accountability
Aside from ESPN's main competitors, such as Fox Sports, NBC Sports, CBS Sports, Turner Sports, and Yahoo! Sports, independent and regional sports-focused media firms and blogs, including Deadspin (now owned by G/O Media), The Big Lead, Bleacher Report (now owned by Turner Sports parent Warner Media), and 700 Level (now associated with NBC Sports parent Comcast), have served as alternatives for fans looking for balanced coverage or better local coverage.

Accountability attempts by third parties range from news articles, websites, and blogs either in a response to specific events or the ongoing lack of or over coverage by ESPN. Rolling Stone writers Jordan Burchette and Michael Weinreb each published articles examining the implications of ESPN's perceived SEC bias during the 2014 college football season. Moreover, independent blogging group Are You Cereal Box's main tactic is to track mentions of ESPN's alleged favorite teams and players via mentions on ESPN.com's front page.

ESPN media outlets

ESPN MVP/Mobile
The book Those Guys Have All the Fun: Inside the World of ESPN notes that Apple CEO Steve Jobs reportedly told ESPN President George Bodenheimer in reference to the network's failed attempt at a mobile virtual network operator mobile phone service, Mobile ESPN, in 2006, that "your phone is the dumbest fucking idea I have ever heard".

Longhorn Network
Concerns have been raised by some fans, bloggers and journalists that ESPN's financial stake in the Longhorn Network (which launched in August 2011) creates a potential conflict of interest. Some fear that ESPN's involvement in the network will inhibit journalistic integrity as ESPN has a financial interest in the success of the athletic programs at the University of Texas. Sports Illustrated writer Richard Deitsch wrote: "The network's existence... creates an impossible situation for ESPN's college football producers and reporters (plenty of whom care about reporting). For every story ESPN does on Texas and its opponents, they'll be skeptics wondering what the motivation was for the story." It has also created issues where the various teams of the Iowa State Cyclones, a Big 12 team well outside the prime Longhorn Network footprint, has had to syndicate and create cable networks carried throughout Iowa (in this case, Mediacom carries a network known as "Cyclones.tv") to carry Longhorn Network-exclusive content involving the Longhorns as an opponent within Iowa under a secondary agreement with UT and ESPN.

Additionally, some have questioned the stipulation included in the network's founding agreement that gives Texas the right to dismiss LHN announcers that do not "reflect the quality and reputation of UT." An ESPN spokesperson addressed the situation by stating: "This is not common in ESPN agreements because this UT network is so unique/new for us ...The provision does not allow for random replacement of commentators or reaction to critical comments... it's more about potential situations where a commentator makes completely inappropriate comments or gets involved in inappropriate actions."

ESPN original programs

First Take
Through the show's success, ESPN First Take has also experienced substantial controversy and faced increasing criticism. The show was criticized for what is perceived by many as its excessive coverage of the career of Tim Tebow. During his tenure with the New York Jets, in which he did not start in a game, and threw just eight passes the entire season, Tebow was nonetheless often a leading topic.

As forward LeBron James began a series of playoff appearances with the Cleveland Cavaliers, host Skip Bayless became well known for his belief that James had been overrated by the media and not received enough criticism for his team's playoff failures. Bayless has himself been criticized by fans as well as members of the media for exaggerating James' failures and diminishing his successes. In an exchange with Dallas Mavericks owner Mark Cuban, Cuban argued that Bayless had reduced his analysis of the 2011 and 2012 NBA Finals series to subjective assessments of player psyche rather than relying on objective analysis based on the schematic principles used by the teams in each series.

The show has also received criticism for its treatment of issues of race. During a December 2012 discussion regarding Washington Redskins quarterback Robert Griffin III and his commenting that he did not wish to be perceived solely as a black quarterback, frequent guest Rob Parker asked whether Griffin III was a "brother" or a "cornball brother". When pressed by host Cari Champion on what he meant, he mentioned that Griffin III had a white fiancé and questioned whether he was a Republican. Parker, though, acknowledged that he did not have any information substantiating that claim. In response, Bayless asked whether Griffin III's braids did anything to assuage his concerns. To many, this exchange was part of a larger trend of the nature of the treatment of issues of race by the show.

Sociopolitical issues

2015 Arthur Ashe Courage Award controversy
In June 2015, ESPN's announcement of Caitlyn Jenner, formerly Bruce Jenner, as the recipient of that year's Arthur Ashe Courage Award, one of its annual ESPY Awards, led to significant criticism among online commenters and some members of the media, with Bob Costas calling the decision to give Jenner the award a "crass exploitation play". Most of the critics of the Jenner award considered Lauren Hill, who played college basketball despite suffering from a brain tumor that would claim her life only a few months later, a more worthy recipient. Others cited Noah Galloway, an Iraq War double amputee who competes in extreme sports and was also a finalist in the spring 2015 season of Dancing with the Stars, as a worthy candidate.

Robert Lee controversy
ESPN made the decision to remove Robert Lee from the broadcast team calling the University of Virginia home opener against College of William and Mary on September 2, 2017, because he shares the same name as Confederate General Robert E. Lee. Robert Lee, who is not related to the confederate general, is of Asian American heritage. The decision was made in the aftermath of the Unite the Right rally in Charlottesville, Virginia, which protested the removal of a statue of Robert E. Lee.

Jemele Hill tweets about President Trump
On September 11, 2017, SportsCenter anchor Jemele Hill made a series of tweets critical of President Donald Trump, including describing him as a "white supremacist". ESPN issued a statement saying Hill's comments "do not represent the position of ESPN. We have addressed this with Jemele and she recognizes her actions were inappropriate." Hill later clarified that she stood by her comments as representative of her personal beliefs. "My regret is that my comments and the public way I made them painted ESPN in an unfair light", she added. Many criticized Hill's comments, including White House press secretary Sarah Huckabee Sanders, who called them "a fireable offense by ESPN"; Trump criticized the network and demanded an apology. Others voiced support for Hill and criticized ESPN and the White House's responses, arguing that Hill's comments were accurate and that a White House official suggesting Hill be fired infringed on the First Amendment.

Coverage of the Hong Kong protests
On October 8, 2019, in the wake of Chinese boycotts of the NBA after Houston Rockets general manager Daryl Morey made a Twitter post in support of the 2019–20 Hong Kong protests, it was reported that ESPN's senior news director Chuck Salituro had issued an internal memo directing on-air personalities to not discuss political aspects of the controversy unrelated to their effects on sport, as per prior directives discouraging "pure politics". On October 10, ESPN faced criticism for displaying a map of China during a SportsCenter report that included Taiwan and the Nine-Dash Line.

Doug Adler lawsuit
Former tennis player and ESPN commentator Doug Adler was fired after making an allegedly racist comment about Venus Williams on-air. In January 2017, during the broadcast of the Australian Open match, Adler commented "Venus is all over her. And you'll see Venus move in and put the guerrilla effect on, charging." ESPN insisted that Adler used not the word he claimed he said, namely guerrilla, but rather gorilla to describe Williams, who is African-American. Adler apologized for the remark after being told by his superiors to apologize on air, so that he could keep his job, but was fired by ESPN the next day. In February 2017, Adler filed a lawsuit against ESPN for wrongful termination.

On-air promotion of Disney+
In November 2019, ESPN's owner The Walt Disney Company launched Disney+, which came with a publicity push through both ABC and ESPN personalities, and the latter was pointed out as a blurring of lines between corporate publicity and journalistic integrity of Disney+. For example, there was a Simpsons-themed SportsCenter "Top 10" to star NFL reporter Adam Schefter tweeting that Disney+ "will change lives". Writing in Slate, Laura Wagner said that the "tongue bath" for Disney+ "represents a new inflection point in ESPN's decline from journalistic institution to entertainment company". Wagner added "This clumsy marketing blitz is an embarrassing exercise that turns ostensible reporters into stooges. It's also a stark example of just how flimsy ESPN's editorial vision has become." Meanwhile, Kelly McBride of the nonprofit journalism organization the Poynter Institute in an interview with The Washington Post said "You're turning the journalist into a salesperson and asking them to upsell the product. That's not the relationship you want the journalist to have with the audience member. You want that relationship to be about trust in the journalist's expertise."

Accusations of a racist culture behind the scenes
In July 2020, New York Times writer Kevin Draper spoke with more than two dozen current and former ESPN employees, who "described a company that projected a diverse outward face, but did not have enough Black executives, especially ones with real decision-making power. They said the company did not provide meaningful career paths for Black employees behind the camera and made decisions based on assumptions that its average viewer is an older White man, in spite of its audience trends."

Accusations of political bias 
Republican political leaders including Donald Trump and Fox News anchor Tucker Carlson have accused ESPN incorporating their political bias into sports news. A 2017 survey of 1,423 adults found that 30 percent of respondents believed that ESPN was politically biased. Of those respondents, 63 percent responded that they saw a liberal bias, while 30 percent saw a conservative bias.

Criticism of employee salaries
ESPN has been criticized for its perceived low salaries relative to other networks. During a presentation of an Inside the NBA postgame show on TNT in November 2016, Kenny Smith satirically told his co-host Charles Barkley to join ESPN so that the two could have a rivalry akin to that of Kevin Durant and Russell Westbrook. Barkley pivoted to his criticism of ESPN, saying "they're not gonna work me like a dog and not pay me." To the humor of his co-hosts, Barkley said that the network would have him on "ESPN One, Two, Three, ESPN News, ESPNU, ESPN Radio," and that the network would have him on ESPN Deportes "saying 'Muy bien, gracias!.

See also
 Criticism of The Walt Disney Company – pertaining to criticism and controversies regarding ESPN's majority owner
 East Coast bias

References

Further reading

 
 

ESPN
Criticism of sports
Espn
Mass media-related controversies in the United States